Sopot is a village in the municipality of Kavadarci, North Macedonia.

Demographics
According to the statistics of Bulgarian ethnographer Vasil Kanchov from 1900, 360 inhabitants lived in Sopot, 225 Muslim Bulgarians, 130 Christian Bulgarians and 5 Romani. According to the 2002 census, the village had a total of 804 inhabitants. Ethnic groups in the village include:

Macedonians 800
Serbs 1
Romani 2
Others 1

References

Villages in Kavadarci Municipality